Semendua Airport  is an airport serving the town of Semendua in Mai-Ndombe Province, Democratic Republic of the Congo.

See also

 List of airports in the Democratic Republic of the Congo

References

 Great Circle Mapper - Semendua

External links
 HERE Maps - Semendua
 OpenStreetMap - Semendua
 OurAirports - Semendua

Airports in Mai-Ndombe Province